Sunshine Radio may refer to:

 Sunshine 855, a radio station covering South Shropshire, North Herefordshire and North Worcestershire
 Sunshine Radio (FM), a radio station based in Hereford
 Sunshine 1530, a defunct station formerly operated by Murfin Media
 Sunshine Radio, a defunct Irish pirate station, which operated in the 1980s
 Sunshine 106.8, a radio station broadcasting to Dublin, Ireland since 2010
 Sunshine Radio (Thailand), a community radio station broadcasting to Pattaya, Hat Yai, and Phuket